Billister is a settlement in the parish of Nesting, on the island of Mainland, in Shetland, Scotland. It is on Lax Firth.

Billister was formerly the terminal for the ferry to Whalsay, although this has now moved to Laxo. The pier was built by the council in 1956.

References

External links

Ports and Harbours of the UK - Quoys (Billister)
Canmore - Muckle Head site record
Canmore - Loch of Garths site record

Villages in Mainland, Shetland